James Edward Welsh (September 17, 1902 – February 12, 1958) was a professional American football player who played during the early years of the National Football League. He was an offensive lineman and a place kicker. A graduate of Colgate University, Welsh began his professional career in 1923 with the NFL's Rochester Jeffersons. The following two seasons, were then spent with the Frankford Yellow Jackets. In 1926, Welsh joined the Pottsville Maroons. He then ended the 1926 season tied for the league lead in extra points, with 10.

Notes

1902 births
1958 deaths
Colgate Raiders football players
Frankford Yellow Jackets players
Pottsville Maroons players
Rochester Jeffersons players